Inbar (lit. "amber") is a kibbutz near Karmiel in the Galilee in northern Israel. Inbar is the country's smallest kibbutz, with only about 10 members.

History
Inbar is located on the site of the biblical village of Kfar Hananya, which was continuously inhabited by Jews from the First Temple until the 16th century.  The Biblical village was situated along the banks of Nahal Tzalmon, and was known for its earthenware pottery that was considered of high quality.  Rabbi Halafta, one of the great interpreters of the Mishnah, lived there in the Talmudic era, and is buried there. In the 16th century the community was abandoned, and its residents moved to Peki'in, where a larger Jewish community existed.  In the end of the 1970s, as part of the HaMitzpim program, a temporary camp was erected for workers who were building moshavim nearby.  The remnants of buildings that were used in the camp were improved by members of the community when they went to live there on Yom Ha'atzmaut in May 1994.

Economy 
The economy of Inbar is based on tourism. The community runs an 18-room guesthouse and country lodge.

See also
 Amit Inbar (born 1972), Israeli Olympic competitive windsurfer, and kitesurfer

References

1994 establishments in Israel
Community settlements
Populated places established in 1994
Populated places in Northern District (Israel)